Johanna Emerentia von Bilang (4 February 1777, Stockholm - 9 May 1857, Stockholm) was a Swedish miniaturist.

Born in Stockholm to the army captain and etching artist Jacob Johan von Bilang and Emerentia Scheding, von Bilang had a very long career producing miniatures, often in ivory, by clients from the nobility and military.

References
 Svenskt konstnärslexikon del I sid 176, Allhems Förlag, Malmö.
 Svenska konstnärer, Biografisk handbok, Väbo förlag, 1987, sid 59, 
 Von Bilang nr 1169 - Adelsvapen-Wiki

1777 births
1857 deaths
18th-century Swedish women artists
19th-century Swedish women artists
19th-century Swedish painters
Artists from Stockholm